Mauro Biglino (born 13 September 1950) is an Italian author, essayist, and translator. Much of his work focuses on the theories concerning the Bible and church history, including conspiracy theories, ufology, and the pseudoscientific hypothesis of ancient astronauts. As he himself declared, his theories are mostly based on the literary works of fringe theorists Erich von Däniken and Zecharia Sitchin. Biglino has also been involved in producing Italian interlinear editions of the Twelve Minor Prophets for Edizioni San Paolo in Cinisello Balsamo, Italy.

He wrote the volume Chiesa Cattolica e Massoneria ("Catholic Church and Freemasonry"), where he declared to have been a Freemason and member of the Italian Freemasonry for more than ten years until the 2000s.

Filmography 
 Creators: The Past as himself (2019)

Selected Bibliography 
 
 
 
 
 
 
 
 
 

Comics based on his works
Elohim series in 15 volumes released between 2014 and 2018.
 
 

Books translated to English
 English: 
 English:

See also

 Elohim
 Garden of Eden
 Masoretic Text
 Old Testament

References

External links
 Italian Official website
 English & French Official website
 "I nuovi antichi alieni di Mauro Biglino: Analisi di un fenomeno editoriale e culturale" Scholarly examination (in Italian) of Mauro Biglino's work as a cultural product

1950 births
21st-century translators
21st-century Italian male writers
Ancient astronauts proponents
Esoteric anthropogenesis
Italian biblical scholars
Italian conspiracy theorists
Italian essayists
Italian Freemasons
Italian male writers
Italian translators
Living people
Male essayists
People associated with ufology
Translators from Hebrew